African Leadership University or ALU is a network of tertiary institutions with operations in both Mauritius and Rwanda with a bachelor's degree.  

ALU's first campus was launched in September 2015 in Mauritius and is known as the African Leadership College. Its second campus was launched in September 2017 in Kigali, Rwanda.

History 
In 2008, Fred Swaniker, an African leadership development expert and Stanford Business School educated social entrepreneur, founded ALU's sister organization, the African Leadership Academy, a secondary institution. In 2015, Swaniker then expanded his efforts further by establishing an institution of higher learning, the African Leadership University, dedicated to teaching leadership skills. In 2015 ALU opened its doors to more than 180 students from across Africa on its main campus in Mauritius. In 2019, ALU made it to Fast Company's list of The World's 50 Most Innovative companies.

Campuses

ALC 
ALC's main campus is located in Pamplemousses, the northern region of Mauritius. ALC Mauritius is a residential campus. The campus opened in October 2015 with 173 students in the inaugural class of 2015. In 2018, the number of students was over 300. ALC offers undergraduate degree programmes through its founding academic partner, Glasgow Caledonian University. AlC offers four different degrees.

ALU Rwanda 
ALU Rwanda is located in Kigali, Rwanda. It is accredited by the Higher Education Council of Rwanda. The undergraduate campus opened in September 2017, with 270 students, while the African Leadership School of Business started its blended Master of Business Administration program in September 2016. ALU Rwanda expanded to Kigali's new Innovation City, where a permanent campus was completed in 2020. ALU Rwanda is a non-residential campus.

External links
African Leadership University website

References

Pan-Africanist organizations
Educational institutions established in 2015
2015 establishments in Rwanda